NGC 1983 (also known as ESO 56-SC133) is an open cluster associated with an emission nebula which is located in the Dorado constellation and part of the Large Magellanic Cloud. It was discovered by John Herschel on 11 November 1836. It has an apparent magnitude of 9.9  and its size is 1.0 arc minutes.

References

External links
 

Open clusters
56-SC133
1983
Dorado (constellation)
Large Magellanic Cloud
Astronomical objects discovered in 1836
Discoveries by John Herschel